Gustav Hügel was an Austrian figure skater. He was the 1897 and 1899-1900 World Champion and the 1901 European Champion. He won the German national championships in 1894 because, at that time, Austria and Germany held joint championships.

Results

References
 Skatabase: 1890s Worlds Results
 Skatabase: 1900s Worlds Results
 Skatabase: 1890s Europeans Results
 Skatabase: 1900s Europeans Results

Navigation

Austrian male single skaters
World Figure Skating Championships medalists
European Figure Skating Championships medalists
Year of birth missing
Year of death missing